The 2nd Division is a semi-professional association football league for men and the third division in Denmark. It is organised by the Divisionsforeningen on behalf of the Danish Football Association (Danish FA; DBU) as part of the nation-wide Danmarksturneringen i fodbold (Herre-DM) and is positioned between the second-tier 1st Division and the fourth-tier Danish 3rd Division in the Danish football league system. Clubs in the league must meet certain criteria concerning appropriate facilities and finances. All of the 2nd Division clubs qualify for the proper rounds of the DBU Pokalen. The number of promoted and relegated clubs has fluctuated over the years. In the 2020–21 season two clubs were directly promoted to the 1st Division, while eight teams were relegated to the Denmark Series. From the 2021–22 season, it was changed to two promotion spots and two relegation spots.

A third-tier league under the auspices of the Danish FA was introduced to the nation-wide league structure in 1936, beginning with two divisions of four clubs each in the 1936–37 season. Due to World War II, the league was placed on hiatus for five years until its reintroduction as a single division with 10 clubs in 1945. In the 1966 season, the league was expanded to include two divisions, coinciding with the dissolution of the Kvalifikationsturneringen and the introduction of the new fourth-tier, Denmark Series (Danmarksserien). It returned to a single division format in the 1975 season, before once again converting to a two division format in 1986, a single division in 1997 and a two division format in 2005. From 1991 to 1997 the league was played as semi-annual seasons, when the higher ranking leagues switched to an autumn-spring calendar match schedule while the lower ranking leagues continued with spring-autumn tournaments — a revisit to the same calendar schedule that had been played until 1956. In 2015–2020, the league consisted of two stages; a preliminary round split into 2–3 groups with clubs qualifying for either a promotion or relegation round.

From 1936–37 and 1939–40, 1966 until 1964 and in the 1986 season, a championship final was played at the end of the season to determine the overall league winners between the west and east groups. The short lived Kvalifikationsligaen in the springs from 1992 to 1995 meant that the league's status as the third-tier in Danish football was dropped one level to temporarily become the fourth best level. In the seasons from 2005–06 to 2010–11, the tournament rules were changed to allow a maximum of eight Superliga reserve teams to compete in the third-tier — the reserve teams were eventually moved to the 2011–12 Danish Reserve League upon its creation. The division has changed its name on several occasions. It has previously been known as III Serie (1936–37 until 1939/40;  or 3. Serie), 3. Division (1945/46 until 1990; or 3. division), before settling with the current name beginning with the 1991-season. Due to a sponsorship arrangement, it was known as Kanal Sport Divisionen during the 2015–16 season.

History

Formation of national third-tier
The decision to establish a nation-wide third-tier league as part of the Danmarksturneringen i fodbold below the second-tier II Serie was made at the annual convention of the Danish FA (DBU), in 1936. The league started its operation in August 1936, when III Serie was created with two geographically divided constituencies, each including four teams playing two matches at home and away. Out of the eight teams, only one gained promotion to the second-tier the following season, following the promotion play-offs at the end of the season, which at the same time determined the overall league champions. With the occupation of Denmark during World War II, the Danmarksturneringen's three league structure was disbanded in 1940.

Reintroduction of the third-tier 1945

In 1945, a Danish third level was reintroduced as the bufferzone between the elite teams and the amateur clubs with 10 teams. One team gained promotion to 2nd Division, and one relegated to the club's respective regional football league. In 1951, The 3rd Division was expanded to 12 teams and to teams was relegated to a newly created Kvalifikationsturneringen – the new buffer between the Danmarksturneringen and the regional football leagues. The structure was changed again in 1966. Two geographical groups with 12 teams each were created. Only one team could be promoted and two teams be relegated. The Danish 2nd Division West would for the most part consist of teams from the Jutland FA and Funen FA, while Danish 2nd Division East would consist of teams from the Zealand FA, Copenhagen FA, Lolland-Falster FA and Bornholm FA. In 1975, the number of teams in the league got expanded and the 3rd Division rolled into one row with 16 teams, where two teams could be promoted to the 2nd Division and teams relegated to the Denmark Series.

The Danish top-flight league was renamed in 1991, which included the second-tier being renamed to 1st Division and the third-tier becoming known as the 2nd Division. From 2005, the 2nd Division was changed to have 14 teams each in the East and West pools, with three teams to promote. In addition, access of up to eight reserve teams of the Danish Superliga clubs was allowed in the 2nd Division. The number of teams in the 2nd Division was increased to 16 teams in 2008. In 2010, the reserve teams were removed from the 2nd Division following the foundation of the Danish Reserve League. The 2nd Division did change again in 2015, that reduced the number of teams in the 2nd Division from 32 to 24. 3 pools with each 8 teams was created, where the four top finishers in each pool would be playing for promotion to the 1st Division, with promotion for the two best-placed teams. Also, there would be a relegation pool for the 12 teams that end up as 5–8 in one of their 3 pools, where the 9–12th places relegated to the Denmark Series.

Sponsors and logos
In 2011, it was announced that for the first time, the third-tier would be given its own logo, taking effect at the start of the 2011–12 season. The league changed its official name to Kanal Sport Divisionen for the 2015–16 season, when the naming rights were acquired by the Danish sports TV-channel Kanal Sport.

Former and current logos for the 2nd Division.

Winners of the 2nd Division and predecessors

III Serie West (1936–1940)

 : Winners of the season's overall league championship final.

III Serie East (1936–1940)

 : Winners of the season's overall league championship final.

3rd Division (1945–1965)

3rd Division West (1966–1974)

 : Winners of the season's overall league championship final.

3rd Division East (1966–1974)

 : Winners of the season's overall league championship final.

3rd Division (1975–1985)

3rd Division West (1986–1990)

 : Winners of the season's overall league championship final.

3rd Division East (1986–1990)

2nd Division West (1991–1997)

2nd Division East (1991–1997)

2nd Division (1997–2005)

2nd Division West (2005–2015)

2nd Division East (2005–2015)

2nd Division, Promotion Group (2015–2020)

2nd Division West (2020–2021)

2nd Division East (2020–2021)

2nd Division (2021–Present)

Footnotes

References

External links
 Official league site 

 
3
Third level football leagues in Europe
Professional sports leagues in Denmark